Marmalade is a sweet conserve made with fruit.

Marmalade may also refer to:

Music
 Marmalade (band), a Scottish pop music group
 "Marmalade" (song), a 2017 song by Macklemore featuring Lil Yachty
 "Marmalade", a 1998 song by System of a Down from their album System of a Down
 Marmalade Records

Other
 Marmalade (magazine), a British art and culture quarterly
 Marmalade (software), a cross-platform game framework for mobile devices, formerly called Airplay SDK
 Marmalade District (Salt Lake City), Utah, US
 Young Marmalade, a British Car insurance company
 Trevor Marmalade (born 1962), Australian comedian

See also

Orange marmalade (disambiguation)
Lady Marmalade
Marmelade, a town in Haiti